Sovkhozny is a rural locality (a settlement) and the administrative center of Pobedenskoye Rural Settlement of Maykopsky District, Russia. The population was 1483 as of 2018. There are 29 streets.

Geography 
Sovkhozny is located 4 km north of Tulsky (the district's administrative centre) by road. Udobny is the nearest rural locality.

References 

Rural localities in Maykopsky District